Puch Hem (born 3 May 1999) is a Cambodian swimmer. He competed in the men's 50 metre freestyle at the 2020 Summer Olympics.

References

External links
 

1999 births
Living people
Cambodian male freestyle swimmers
Olympic swimmers of Cambodia
Swimmers at the 2020 Summer Olympics
Place of birth missing (living people)